

Calling formats

00       International Direct Dialing code

List of area codes in the Canary Islands

References
Canary Islands dialing codes - accessed 3 May 2010.
Call someone on the Canary Islands  - accessed 14 November 2018.

Canary Islands
Telecommunications in the Canary Islands
Telecommunications in Spain
Telephone numbers
Telephone numbers